Amish in the City is an American reality television series which premiered on UPN on July 28, 2004. The plot revolved around five Amish teenagers experiencing "modern" (non-Amish) culture by living in a house with six mainstream American teenagers.

The show follows the Amish teenagers as they explore their freedom from the Amish religious code, which is a common element of the Rumspringa ("running around") period before they decide whether to join the Amish church. Typically, nearly 90% of teenagers end their Rumspringa with the choice to be baptized as Amish; however, at the conclusion of the show, it was unclear which of the show's participants chose not to return to the Amish church and which went back to the Amish way of life. Many  accused the show of giving the participants an unrealistic view of "modern" culture and of showing the behavior of the unadjusted Amish like a "spectator sport" for mainstream American viewers. The producers stated that they plan to follow the original series with updates on the current status of the cast, especially since their decisions at the end of the series may change.

The concept was initially denounced by some for appearing to capitalize upon popular stereotypes about the Amish; later critical reviews were more positive.

The series was later aired in the United Kingdom on LIVINGtv2 and Trouble, in New Zealand on TV2, in Denmark on Kanal 5 and in Sweden on Kanal 5.

Cast

See also
Breaking Amish
Return to Amish

References

External links
 
  - 2006 New Line TV site including video & cast bio updates
 Amish In The City Season Finale - article about series finale, including its date

2004 American television series debuts
2004 American television series endings
2000s American reality television series
Amish in popular culture
UPN original programming
English-language television shows
Television shows set in Los Angeles
Television series by New Line Television